The 2017 Liga 3 Central Sulawesi is a qualifying round for the national round of 2017 Liga 3.

Format 
In this competition, the teams are divided into two groups of four. The winner will represent Central Sulawesi Region in national round of 2017 Liga 3.

Teams 
There are 8 clubs which will participate the league in this season.

Group stage 
This stage scheduled starts on 25 July 2017.

Group A

Group B

Knockout stage

Semifinals

Final

References 

2017 in Indonesian football
Sport in Central Sulawesi